Eclectic paganism, also occasionally termed universalist or non-denominational paganism, is a form of modern paganism where practitioners blend paganism with aspects of other religions or philosophies. In the book Handbook of New Age, Melissa Harrington states that "Eclectic Pagans do not follow any particular Paganism, but follow a Pagan religious path, that includes the overall Pagan ethos of reverence for the ancient Gods, participation in a magical world view, stewardship and caring for the Earth, and 'nature religion. The practice of eclectic paganism is particularly popular with pagans in North America and the British Isles.

Eclectic paganism contrasts with reconstructionist paganism: whereas reconstructionists strive for authenticity to historical religious traditions of specific groups or time periods, the eclectic approach borrows from several different cultures, philosophies, and time periods.

Some see benefits and drawbacks to the eclectic pagan label. It is broad and allows for various practices and beliefs and without concrete rules, practitioners can explore various religions, philosophies, practices, and cultures while remaining within the bounds of the label. Some also create their own beliefs, philosophies, and rules.  This label may also be confusing, and some do not approve of blurring the lines between cultures, leading to accusations of cultural misappropriation.

Use of social media 

The use of social media within eclectic paganism is very common. Within cultures where pagan or occult beliefs and practices are a minority, social media can provide a safe haven for learning and discussion; and social media allows for the creation of pagan communities. With the advent of social media, information can be reached by anyone, rather than being passed down through oral traditions and within families or covens, as was traditionally common. These communities are vast and can incorporate multiple religions, traditions, and cultures; though some have been accused of misappropriating other cultures. 

Within this community, "witchy aesthetic" has been portrayed by some as the norm, or even as correct. Some criticize this as undermining the beliefs of individuals and believe that it shows an inaccurate description of the concept to outside people.

See also
 Neopaganism in the United Kingdom
 Neopaganism in the United States
 Cultural appropriation

References

External links
Eclectic Pagans
Eclectic Traditions 

Modern pagan traditions